The Bridge in Tredyffrin Township was a historic stone arch bridge carrying Gulph Road across Trout Creek in Tredyffrin Township, Chester County, Pennsylvania, USA. There were stone wing walls at each end, with roughly squared stone voussoirs forming the arch ring. The vault of the arch had been sealed with gunite when the bridge was surveyed in 1982, and the parapets had also been topped with concrete. The bridge was built at an unknown date in the late 19th or early 20th century, and was a well-preserved, typical example of stone arch bridge construction in that period.

It was listed on the National Register of Historic Places in 1988. The bridge was replaced in 2008 with a concrete beam bridge finished with a stone facade to resemble the old structure. It was delisted from the National Register in 2010.

References 

Bridges in Chester County, Pennsylvania
Former National Register of Historic Places in Pennsylvania
Road bridges in Pennsylvania
Demolished bridges in the United States
Stone arch bridges in the United States